Philotheca fitzgeraldii is a species of flowering plant in the family Rutaceae and is endemic to the south of Western Australia. It is an erect, compact or spreading shrub with cylindrical, glandular-warty leaves and white flowers arranged singly in leaf axils and on the ends of branchlets.

Description
The ten stamens are glabrous.

Taxonomy and naming
This philotheca was first formally described in 1904 by Cecil Andrews who gave it the name Eriostemon fitzgeraldii and published the description in Journal of the West Australian Natural History Society from specimens he collected "on sand plains north of Esperance" in 1903. In 1998, Paul Wilson changed the name to Philotheca fitzgeraldii in the journal Nuytsia.

Distribution and habitat
Philotheca fitzgeraldii grows in heath and woodland between Norseman and Caiguna in the Coolgardie, Esperance Plains and Mallee biogeographic regions.

Conservation status
This species is classified as "not threatened" by the Western Australian Government Department of Parks and Wildlife,

References

fitzgeraldii
Flora of Western Australia
Sapindales of Australia
Plants described in 1904
Taxa named by Cecil Rollo Payton Andrews